Dominik Jackson (born 21 April 1984 in Scampton, Lincolnshire) is a British racing driver. He started his career in UK karting, before going to Germany to compete in the Formula BMW ADAC Series. He has also raced in Formula Palmer Audi. Due to his lack of funding, he very rarely competes a full series championship. His last current drive was for Tottenham Hotspur in the Superleague Formula in the 2008 season for the Portuguese round.

Racing record

Superleague Formula
(key) (Races in bold indicate pole position) (Races in italics indicate fastest lap)

References

External links
 Driver Database information

English racing drivers
1984 births
Living people
Superleague Formula drivers
Formula Palmer Audi drivers
Formula Ford drivers
Formula BMW USA drivers
Formula BMW ADAC drivers
U.S. F2000 National Championship drivers
People from Scampton
Mücke Motorsport drivers